Fujitsu Technology Solutions is a European information technology vendor with a presence in markets in Europe, the Middle East, Africa, as well as India. A subsidiary of Fujitsu Limited headquartered in Tokyo, Japan, FTS was founded in 2009 after Fujitsu bought out Siemens' 50% share of Fujitsu Siemens Computers.

The company is focused on serving large, medium, and small-sized companies. Fujitsu Technology Solutions offers IT products and services, for data centers, managed infrastructure and infrastructure as a service.

Products and services
Fujitsu Technology Solutions provides a broad range of information and communications technology based products.

Current
Fujitsu Technology Solutions' current products and services include:

 Media Center
 ESPRIMO Q
 Notebooks
 CELSIUS
 LIFEBOOK
 Desktop PC
 ESPRIMO
 Workstation
 CELSIUS
 Tablet PC
 STYLISTIC
 Convertible PC
 LIFEBOOK T
 Industry Standard Servers
 PRIMERGY
 PRIMERGY BladeFrame
 Mission critical IA-64 servers
 PRIMEQUEST
 UNIX system based servers
 SPARC Enterprise Servers
 PRIMEPOWER 250, 450, 900, 1500, 2500
 Storage
 ETERNUS
 S/390-compatible Mainframes
 S- series, SX- series
 Flat panel displays
 Operating systems
 SINIX: Unix variant, later renamed Reliant UNIX, available for RISC and S/390-compatible platforms
 BS2000: EBCDIC-based operating system for SPARC, x86 and S/390-compatible systems
 VM2000: EBCDIC-based hypervisor for S/390-compatible platform, capable of running multiple BS2000 and SINIX virtual machines

Discontinued
Fujitsu Technology Solutions' discontinued products and services include:

 Media Center
 ACTIVY
 Notebooks
 AMILO
 AMILO PRO
 ESPRIMO Mobile
 Liteline
 Mobile
 SCENIC Mobile
 Desktop PC
 SCALEO
 SCENIC
 AMILO DESKTOP
 Handheld
 Pocket LOOX
 Flat panel displays:
 Myrica
 Liquid crystal display televisions
 Plasma display televisions
 SCALEOVIEW
 Liquid crystal display computer monitors
 SCENICVIEW
 Liquid crystal display computer monitors

Product Compliance Laboratory
Fujitsu Technology Solutions operates a product compliance laboratory which is used in house and by third parties.

See also
 List of computer system manufacturers
 List of Fujitsu products

References

Computer hardware companies of Germany
Fujitsu subsidiaries